Šent Janž pri Radljah is a dispersed settlement in the hills north of Radlje ob Dravi in Slovenia, located on the border with Austria.

Name
The name of the settlement was changed from Šent Janž pri Radljah (literally, 'Saint John near Radlje') to Suhi Vrh pri Radljah (literally, 'dry peak near Radlje') in 1955. The name was changed on the basis of the 1948 Law on Names of Settlements and Designations of Squares, Streets, and Buildings as part of efforts by Slovenia's postwar communist government to remove religious elements from toponyms. The name Šent Janž pri Radljah was restored in 1993.

Mahrenberg Castle
The ruins of Mahrenberg Castle lie on a hill south of the settlement. The castle was first mentioned in written documents dating to 1193 and was used until the Renaissance. In 1697 it burned down and only its polygonal foundations are preserved.

References

External links
Šent Janž pri Radljah on Geopedia

Populated places in the Municipality of Radlje ob Dravi